Effetre glass (Italian F3, abbreviated form of fratelli tre, "three brothers"), once known as Moretti glass, is a kind of glass used in lampworking. It is considered a medium-soft glass and is popular because of its wide range of colors and the ease with which it is molded and shaped when hot. Genuine Effetre glass is made in Italy by the Effetre Murano S.r.l that has replaced since 2010 the Effetre International Company, on the island of Murano. Effetre is a variety of soda-lime glass.

References

External links
 Effetre home page

Glass production